Grevillea latifolia is a species of flowering plant in the family Proteaceae and is endemic to the Kimberley region of Western Australia. It is a shrub with round or broadly egg-shaped to heart-shaped leaves with the narrower end towards the base, and clusters of pale to deep flowers that turn red as they age.

Description

Taxonomy
Grevillea latifolia was first formally described in 1923 by Charles Gardner in the Bulletin of the Western Australian Forests Department.

Distribution and habitat
This grevillea grows amongst medium to low trees in woodlands or grasslands in scattered populations on the Mitchell and Gardner Plateaus, the King Edward and Lawley Rivers almost to Wyndham in the east. It grows in sandy or loamy soils on sandstone, quartzite or laterite.

Ecology
Grevillea latifolia is able to regenerate from both seed and from its lignotuber.

Conservation status
This grevillea is listed as "Priority Two" by the Western Australian Government Department of Biodiversity, Conservation and Attractions, meaning that it is poorly known and from only one or a few locations.

See also
 List of Grevillea species

References

latifolia
Proteales of Australia
Eudicots of Western Australia
Taxa named by Charles Gardner
Plants described in 1923